Martina Navratilova and Bob Bryan defeated Květa Peschke and Martin Damm in the final, 6–2, 6–3 to win the mixed doubles tennis title at the 2006 US Open. It was Navratilova's 59th and final major title, 32 years after her first (at the 1974 French Open).

Daniela Hantuchová and Mahesh Bhupathi were the defending champions, but neither participated in the Mixed Doubles tournament.

Seeds

  Lisa Raymond /  Jonas Björkman (first round)
  Rennae Stubbs /  Mark Knowles (first round)
  Samantha Stosur /  Leander Paes (first round)
  Yan Zi /  Todd Perry (second round)
  Martina Navratilova /  Bob Bryan (champions)
  Katarina Srebotnik /  Nenad Zimonjić (second round)
  Elena Likhovtseva /  Daniel Nestor (first round)
  Cara Black /  Simon Aspelin (first round)

Draw

Finals

Top half

Bottom half

External links
2006 US Open – Doubles draws and results at the International Tennis Federation

Mixed Doubles
US Open (tennis) by year – Mixed doubles